In Bangladeshi humour, Murad Takla refers to someone who writes Bengali words using the Latin script in a bizarre or unorthodox fashion, which unintentionally produces a distorted meaning. The phrase originated in the 2010s.

History
A Facebook comment posted on 14 July, 2012 was the origin of Murad Takla. In the comment, a commenter told the other commenter to speak with logic. He asked why the person had a lame profile picture, and told him to learn before speaking. The screenshot of the comment went viral on Facebook because of its unintentional humour: The commenter wrote Murad Takla ("Murod thakle" in Bengali) which was intended to mean "if you have courage", but its pronunciation simply means "a bald person named Murad". The phrase became popular and synonymous with those who write distorted Bengali using the Latin script.

After the incident, a Facebook page named Murad Takla was created in 18 November of the same year. The page was created for sharing humorous posts written in Bengali using the Latin script. The page gained popularity, giving some people a greater understanding of the potential problems of writing Bengali with Latin letters.

The term has also been used to refer to Bangladeshi politician Murad Hasan after a controversy over the leak of an obscene phone call. The discussion about Murad Hasan led to some confusion about the term.

Dictionary
In 2020, the Murad Takla Dictionary was published by Simu Nasser and Pian Mughdha Nabi for the purpose of understanding the meaning of sentences written in the "Takla language".

Examples

See also
Romanisation of Bengali

Notes and references

Notes

References

External links 
 
 

Internet terminology
Bengali words and phrases
Internet memes introduced in 2012
Internet memes introduced from Bangladesh
2010s fads and trends